Girls of Summer is a 2008 comedy film directed by Max Tash.

Plot
Holly is a retired model who is the only female player on her cousin Jake's softball team, the Hornets. Jake, while drinking in a bar, makes a $50,000 bet with Gary, who coaches a rival team, that he can win the league championship with a team made up entirely of himself and female models. The first game is a disaster, but other more talented players join the team. This still is not enough for the team to improve by much. Eventually, with hard work and training, the Hornets contend for the league championship. While they lose the final game against Gary's team, Gary is willing to let Jake have double or nothing.

Main cast
Tarah DeSpain as Holly McBride
Tim Pilleri as Jake McBride
Levin O'Connor as Gary
Sabrina Renata Maahs as Olive
Rob Cesterino as Big Wave Dave
Kimberly Alexander as Rachel
Anna Bohn as Candace
Alice Hunter as Kat

References

External links
 

2008 films
2000s English-language films